Entychides is a genus of mygalomorph trapdoor spiders in the family Euctenizidae, and was first described by Eugène Simon in 1888. Originally placed with the Ctenizidae, it was moved to the wafer trapdoor spiders in 1985, then to the Euctenizidae in 2012.

Species
 it contains four species in Mexico, the Southwestern United States, and the Lesser Antilles:
Entychides arizonicus Gertsch & Wallace, 1936 – USA
Entychides aurantiacus Simon, 1888 (type) – Mexico
Entychides dugesi Simon, 1888 – Mexico
Entychides guadalupensis Simon, 1888 – Guadeloupe

References

Euctenizidae
Mygalomorphae genera
Spiders of North America
Taxa named by Eugène Simon